Helen Atkinson-Wood (born 14 March 1955) is an English actress and comedian born in Cheadle Hulme, Cheshire.

She studied fine art at the Ruskin School, Oxford University, where she performed with Rowan Atkinson (no relation). She also performed at the Edinburgh Festival Fringe, where she met Ben Elton. Whilst at Oxford, she took part in an OUDS production of Richard II. Also in this production was Tim McInnerny, who played the lead. She later appeared together with McInnerny in an episode of Blackadder the Third.

Biography
Atkinson-Wood was a regular presenter of Central Television's controversial O.T.T. and had a small role in the 1984 Young Ones episode "Nasty". She is known for her role as Mrs Miggins in Blackadder the Third (co-written by Ben Elton and Richard Curtis).

She was the only regular female cast member on the radio comedy programme Radio Active, where she played Anna Daptor and other roles, and also participated in the programme's televisual equivalent, KYTV. She also appeared in the final episode of Joking Apart as a morning television presenter. In 2007, she guest-starred in the Doctor Who audio play I.D.. She played the role of Sybil Ramkin in a BBC radio adaptation of Guards! Guards! by Terry Pratchett.

Atkinson-Wood has been a regular presenter for the Channel 4 series Collector's Lot and has made guest appearances on programmes such as Call My Bluff. She was a guest in episode 9 of the C series of QI, when she answered a question deemed almost impossible by host Stephen Fry by correctly naming a chemical reaction equation as an explosion of custard powder, earning 200 points. This was because, she claimed, she had studied domestic science at school. Through answering this single question, she holds the highest cumulative total of any QI panellist.

Craig Ferguson wrote in his book American on Purpose that he and Atkinson-Wood were in a romantic relationship that lasted five years. He acknowledges that she changed his life "beyond recognition" by improving his health and his career.

Selected performances

Movie and television
 Mrs. Miggins, Blackadder the Third, 6 episodes
 The Young Ones, 1 episode

Theatre
 Beatrice Voysey in The Voysey Inheritance by Harley Granville Barker. Directed by Greg Hersov at the Royal Exchange, Manchester. (1989)
 Agatha Posket in The Magistrate by Arthur Wing Pinero. Directed by Greg Hersov at the Royal Exchange, Manchester. (2001)
 Polina in The Seagull by Anton Chekov. Directed by Greg Hersov at the Royal Exchange, Manchester. (2003)
 Fritz in Cold Meat Party by Brad Fraser. World premiere directed by Braham Murray at the Royal Exchange, Manchester. (2003) 
 Frosine in The Miser by Moliere. Directed by Helena Kaut-Howson at the Royal Exchange, Manchester. (2009)

References

External links

1955 births
Living people
People from Cheadle Hulme
Alumni of the Ruskin School of Art
English television actresses
English television presenters
English women comedians
British comedy actresses